The Fox Wars were two conflicts between the French and the Fox (Meskwaki or Red Earth People; Renards; Outagamis) Indians that lived in the Great Lakes region (particularly near the Fort of Detroit) from 1712 to 1733.  These territories are known today as the states of Michigan and Wisconsin in the United States. The Wars exemplified colonial warfare in the transitional space of New France, occurring within the complex system of alliances and enmities with native peoples and colonial plans for expansion.

The Fox controlled the Fox River system.  This river was vital for the fur trade between French Canada and the North American interior, because it allowed river travel from Green Bay in Lake Michigan to the Mississippi River.  The French wanted the rights to use the river system to gain access to both the Mississippi and trade contacts with tribes to the west.

The wars claimed thousands of lives and initiated a slave trade whereby Fox Indians were captured by native allies of New France and then sold as slaves to the French colonial population. Indeed, alliances between the French and other native groups (such as Ottawa, Miamis and Sioux) as well as those between the Fox and other native groups (such as the Sauk, Mascoutens and Kickapoos) were an important aspect of the Wars, influencing every stage of the conflicts, including the causes, the fighting and the conclusion.

The First Fox War (1712–1716) began with inter-alliance violence and ended with the surrender of a large group of Fox and the subsequent peace deal.  As was custom, peace offerings required the exchange of goods and of prisoners to account for those who died in the conflict, acknowledging the importance of this exchange for establishing peace. The Second Fox War (1728–1733) was far more destructive than the first, and ended with the near annihilation of the Fox population.

Prior to the Fox Wars
The Fox Indians were living in eastern Wisconsin at the time of their first contacts with the French around 1670. The Fox unsuccessfully sought to establish themselves as middlemen between the French and the Sioux, one of their two traditional enemies, the other being the Ojibwas (Chippewas) in northern Wisconsin.

Not only were the Fox unsuccessful, but prior to 1701, many wars between aboriginal people, which also included the French, against the Iroquois were ravaging the aboriginal lands of the Pays d'en Haut. The Iroquoian wars brought fear and urgency for the French to attempt to save what was left of their trade alliances.  Their alliances were in jeopardy, and also, in 1697 the western posts were closed as a result of the termination by Louis XIV of the fur trade west of Montreal. Historian Richard White illustrates central Wisconsin at the end of the seventeenth century as "a vast refugee center, its situation constantly changing, nations socializing, cooperating, feuding, fighting, constantly adjusting their strategies to shift in French trading policy, which was always the dominant reality." Thus, when the Peace Conference of 1701 finally took place in Montreal, the French were quick to establish a French protectorate in the Great Lakes region.  Nevertheless, the question still remained as to how they would facilitate trade with their southern partners, when their main trading posts had been closed. From this point on, the Great Lakes region was going to be even more unstable.

First Fox War

After the Peace Conference of 1701, Antoine de Lamothe Cadillac resolved the trade issue by establishing a new fort, Fort Pontchartrain, at Detroit. This location was strategic, as it allowed access to the water trade routes, which were more accessible than Montreal, and the warpaths of the Great Lakes region. Despite enabling access to this region by establishing a fort, the French could not survive without the help of the aboriginal people. Governor Cadillac invited numerous tribes to settle in the area. Ottawa and Huron peoples established villages in the area, soon joined by the Potawatomi, Miamis, and Ojibwa.  The population may have reached 6,000 at times. This was positive for the French, but their presence and the presence of the Fox would aggravate things in the region.

Indigenous groups that were enemies lived fairly far apart, but in Detroit, they lived side by side competing for a concrete and practical relationship with the French. As French colonizers sought to enlarge their influence in the West, they sought to ally themselves with the Indians as commercial and military partners. At the time, French imperial policy had already privileged certain aboriginal tribes, in particular the Ojibwa-Ottawa-Potawatimi confederacy and the Illini confederacy in the south, and the Sioux were the next profitable alliance. The Wisconsin tribes (Fox, Sauk, Mascouten, Kickapoo and Winnebago), with the intention of dominating the post, prevented the French from having direct trade access to the Sioux. Concurrently, they would disrupt the lives of the Ottawas and Miamis near Detroit, as well as the French settlement.

In the spring of 1712, a large group of Fox under Lamyma, a peace chief, and Pemoussa, a war chief, established villages in the area, including a fort with easy gunshot range of Portchartrain. The Fox outnumbered the French and Hurons. However, their luck changed with the arrival of 600 allied warrior under Ottawa war chief Saguima and Potawatomi chief Makisabé which reversed the fighting situation. Jacques-Charles Renaud Dubuisson, who wanted the Fox removed from their village, had ordered these reinforcements. For nineteen days, the Fox fought and kept their footing with the French. After several days, the Fox asked for a ceasefire and returned some hostages; however, no ceasefire was granted. Several days later, another parley occurred, as the Fox tried to seek protection for the women and children. Dubuisson chose to let his allies decide their course; they chose to grant no mercy. After nineteen days, during a nighttime thunderstorm, the Fox escaped their village and fled north. The French-allied Indians cornered them near the head of the Detroit River and inflicted four more days of fighting.

By the end of the siege and pursuit, around 1,000 Fox and Mascouten men, women and children were killed (including many of the captives). The French lost 30 men, and their allies had 60 fatalities. It was not until 1726, with the arrival of Charles de Beauharnois de La Boische, that the Fox and French actually achieve peace. In the past, there had been several attempts to find peace, however, each one failing and causing the Fox to return to war.  As a result, during this period, enslaved Fox (men, women and children) entered Canada through raids and became a dominant source of enslaved labour in the Saint Lawrence Valley.

Second Fox War

For the Fox, the start and the potential end to their conflict lay in the slave trade. The Fox were still willing to return to the French alliance if they could secure the return of their captives. In fact, all they wanted was to be considered as allies and kin, not enemies. However, the French officials supported the Illinois, Ottawa, Ojibwa, and Huron, who were against the Fox. As a result, the peace treaty from 1726 was annulled in the summer of 1727.

With this peace treaty being annulled, the Fox declared war on the French and all their Indian allies. For the next four years, the French invested a lot of money and, with their allies, descended on Fox villages with an extreme advantage. The French pursued destruction of the Fox to such an extent as to damage their relations with other tribes. The Sioux and the Iowa refused to grant the Fox sanctuary.  By the summer of 1730, the Fox population was weakening and continued to be attacked until the Sauk finally granted them sanctuary. The Sauk and Fox fought off the French with the help of western Indians, who were aware of Beauharnois' plan for decimation. This final push would cause Beauharnois to grant a "General Pardon" in 1738 and for peace to be restored.

Their historical feuds with New France encouraged many Sauk and Fox warriors to develop kinship ties with France's rivals, the British.  These ties continued to be significant as late as the War of 1812, when many Sauk and Fox fought on the side of British North America.

French finances

The financial situation of the colony before the first Fox War was a state of semi-bankruptcy. The War of Spanish Succession had taken a significant toll on the funds of France, and by extension, on the resources available to the colony of New France. Therefore, the colony had to maximize its profits and try to minimize its spending. This posed a particular problem in respect to the long-standing tensions with the Fox natives and their long-standing enemies, the Cree and Assiniboines natives.

The financial justification for wanting to prevent war was very simple for the French. Periods of war slowed down the production of fur by the natives and New France was in no position to lose any more money that had already been spent elsewhere. This lack of funds made the French dependent on their allies for furs.  Large scale expeditions could not be carried out by French voyageurs, instead the voyageurs would travel into native hunting grounds to make their trades and maintain relationships. These relationships were vital to French economic success, but this also bound them to act as diplomatic partners, becoming embroiled in conflicts between Native groups as part of their trade agreements.

Slavery and the Fox Wars

The Fox Wars facilitated the entry of Fox slaves into colonial New France in two ways: as spoils of French military officers or through direct trading. Beginning with the 1716 treaty, slavery became an ongoing element of the Fox-French relationship. As historian Brett Rushforth explains,

Fox slavery in New France thus had a precarious symbolic power. On the one hand, the exchange of slaves signaled the possible end of conflict, while, on the other hand, it also served as a motive for inciting more conflict. In an early French manuscript describing the history of Green Bay, it is suggested that to gain peace with the Fox, it is more beneficial for opposing groups to simply return Fox captives than to take up arms against the Fox. "If this amnesty for slaves is not reached, and if the Fox do not maintain their promises for peace and "take up the hatchet anew, it will be necessary to reduce them by armed forces of both colonies acting in concert." Slaves were so commonly held that "every recorded complaint made by the Fox against the French and their native allies centered on the return of Fox captives, the most significant issue perpetuating the Fox Wars into subsequent decades."

Yet, long after the conflicts, Fox slaves worked in domestic service, unskilled labour and fieldwork, among other tasks throughout New France.  Despite the abolishment of slavery in New France in accordance with the 1709 ordinance, Fox slavery was widespread. This pattern of slavery is evidence that intercultural experience in New France was sometimes vicious.

Tensions and economic allies
After the First Fox War, roughly 1,000 Fox slaves were taken by the coalition of Native groups who were fighting the Fox (namely the Illinois). In addition, some were taken and sold to the French in Detroit and in return, they received goods and credit. The impact of these slave holdings tied into the tensions surrounding the Second Fox War. This demonstrated a distinct lack of control by the French over the trade that they depended upon in the early years of New France.

After the First Fox War, there were tensions between the Fox and the French in Detroit, for holding slaves. Always wanting to secure French trade agreements, the Governor General of Canada, General Philippe de Rigaud de Vaudreuil, agreed to return the Fox slaves in his possession. This agreement relied on certain conditions. The  first request was that the Fox return their slaves to other Native groups. The second request was that new slaves be brought to the French in the following year. The French desire for slaves would lead the Fox into conducting more slave raids, and increasing tension between Native groups.

The Illinois would persist during this period in denying their holding of any Fox slaves, but the French were impotent to force the Illinois to return the slaves in their possession. This in turn caused tensions to boil over and spark the Second Fox War. By the end of the Second Fox War, France had lost a trading partner, and a certain amount of economic influence. Another aspect that was made apparent through these tensions was the lack of control over the trade that New France had found itself to be reliant on. This lack of control stemmed from the political nature of the slave trade and the adeptness at which Illinois natives had used it to anger the Fox and lock the French into alliances. As a result, this was another event that led to the decline of the French power in Great Lakes Region.

Notes

References

External links
 Sauk and Fox History
 Virtual Museum of New France

Sac and Fox
Battles involving Native Americans
Wars involving the indigenous peoples of North America
18th-century conflicts
Native American history of Michigan
Native American history of Wisconsin
First Nations history
History of the Midwestern United States
Pre-statehood history of Michigan
Pre-statehood history of Wisconsin
New France
Military history of the Great Lakes